Geritola frankdaveyi, the Warri epitola, is a butterfly in the family Lycaenidae. It is found in the Niger Delta of Nigeria. The habitat consists of forests.

References

Endemic fauna of Nigeria
Butterflies described in 1999
Poritiinae